Lyre GAA is a Gaelic Athletic Association club which takes its name from the nearby village of Lyre, County Cork, and is based in the village of Banteer in the north-west of County Cork, Ireland. The club plays Football and is affiliated with Banteer Hurling Club from the same parish. Founded in 1899, the club competes in the Duhallow Junior A Football Championship.

Their first team competes in the Duhallow Junior A Football Championship and the Duhallow Junior A Football League. In 2010, the club won its first ever Duhallow Junior A Football Championship title and won their second title in 2013. Lyre also reached the final in 2015 and 2019.

History

Overview
The club was formed in 1899 and entered the Duhallow Football Championship when it was founded in 1933. Lyre won their first Duhallow Junior Football Championship in 2010 defeating rivals Kanturk in the final. They also defeated Cullen in the 2013 final.

Hurling

Lyre never fielded a hurling team as the club goes under the name of Banteer for hurling. The club has won 8 Duhallow Hurling Championships.

List of JAFC Finals

Ladies Football

Pitch and Facilities 
Lyres GAA play their home matches in Banteer Community Sportsfield which is based in Banteer.

Facilities 
Banteer Community Sportsfield and complex is a community owned facility in Banteer. The local GAA club, soccer club and athletics club use these facilities. The complex has a park area, 2 pitches, 2 sets of dressing rooms, several walks around the pond and pitches, a children's playgrounds, a ball wall, a museum/exhibition area with a shop and there is accessibility offered by Banteer railway station.

It is the first community-owned, full size, multi-use astro-turf pitch in Munster.

Main Pitch 
The original main pitch is usually used for club matches. There is a small stand which can hold up to 200 people and a clubhouse which is under the stand that's adjacent to the pitch. The clubhouse includes 4 changing rooms with showers, an equipment room and a kitchen.

The main pitch often hosts the Duhallow Championship matches and finals, most recently the 2021 hurling final. The pitch is also subject to a lot of high-profile matches in the Cork Premier Senior Hurling Championship and the Cork Premier Senior Football Championship, most recently hosting Blackrock and Charleville in 2021.

Astro Pitch 
In 2020, the first phase of an ambitious €1.5million project to develop a suite of world-class sporting facilities in the village of Banteer was completed. In February 2020, the Banteer Community Sportsfield Project was awarded a grant under the Rural Regeneration and Development Fund. With this grant an astro-turf pitch was built over an existing secondary pitch at the sports complex which was usually used for training. The new Astro is still used for training and hosts some matches.

The facility is available year-round for use by a range of different sports clubs across Cork county, west Limerick and east Kerry. The pitch is lined out for soccer and a lot of soccer clubs in Duhallow use this facility as well as the local soccer club in Banteer.

This will incorporate a new spectator stand, changing rooms/showers, and a tea room and a community museum.

Museum/Exhibition Area 
A museum/exhibition area for sports memorabilia will be built also for people who are interested in viewing old articles, photos, videos outlining the historic achievements of over a 100 years of Banteer Sports.

Rivalries

Kanturk
Lyre won their first Duhallow Junior A Football Championship against Kanturk in 2010. Historically, there were many clashes in the division between these neighbors but in recent seasons Kanturk have climbed the football grades. They most recently met in the 2022 Duhallow Junior Football Championship.

Recent Results/Upcoming Fixtures

2021

2022

Honours

County 
Cork Junior B Football Championship
  Runners-Up (1): 2000
Cork U15 C Football Championship
  Winners (1): 2022

Duhallow 
Duhallow Junior A Football Championship
  Winners (2): 2010, 2013
  Runners-Up (2): 2015, 2019
Duhallow Under 21 A Football Championship
  Winners (1): 2010
Duhallow Junior B Football League
  Winners (2): 1999, 2010
Duhallow Co Qualifier Championship
  Winners (5): 2000, 2001, 2004, 2005, 2006
Duhallow Junior B Football Championship
  Winners (2): 2004, 2006
  Runners-Up (1): 2005
Duhallow Minor B Football Championship
  Winners (1): 1999, 2006
Duhallow Minor B Football League
  Winners (1): 1999
Duhallow Junior A Football League
  Runners-Up (1): 2016
North Cork U15 C Football Championship
  Winners (1): 2022

Notable players
Double Olympic gold medalist Dr.  was a midfielder for the football team, while he also lined out with the Banteer hurling team. A statue was erected of Dr. "Pat" at the Banteer GAA grounds in January 2007.

See also
 Lyre
 Banteer GAA

References

External links
Lyre leave it too late as Lisgoold hold on for one-point win
Lyre lads aiming to make amends for last year’s near miss

Gaelic games clubs in County Cork
Gaelic football clubs in County Cork
1899 establishments in Ireland